Green star may refer to:

Green star (astronomy), a white or blue star that appears to be green due to an optical illusion
One of the Esperanto symbols, the green star, or verda stelo
Green Star (Australia), an environmental rating system for buildings in Australia
Green Star Express, a bus company in the Philippines
Green Star Media, a British publishing company
Green Star Line, an American shipping line of 1919–1923
Green Star Series, five science fantasy novels by Lin Carter
Sto-Oa, a fictional star that lies at the center of the DC Comics universe